João Paulo "Jota" Marques Gonçalves (born 17 June 2000) is a Portuguese professional footballer who plays as a defender for Tondela.

Playing career
Gonçalves made his professional debut with Tondela  in a 3-2 Primeira Liga loss to Gil Vicente F.C. on 14 July 2020.

References

External links
 
 Fora de Jogo Profile

2000 births
Living people
People from Espinho, Portugal
Portuguese footballers
Association football defenders
Primeira Liga players
C.D. Tondela players
Sportspeople from Aveiro District